The Copa do Brasil Sub-20 is a Brazilian football competition run by the Brazilian Football Confederation for under–20 teams. The first edition was played from October 2012 to December of the same year.

Finals

Winners and runners-up

References 

Youth football competitions in Brazil
Football cup competitions in Brazil
Under-20 association football‎